The 1968 National Soccer League season was the forty-fifth season under the National Soccer League (NSL) name. The season began in late May and concluded in early October with Sudbury Italia securing the double (regular-season title, and NSL Championship). Sudbury finished first in the standings with 29 points with a single-point difference between Toronto Hellas. Italia would face Toronto Hellas once more in the NSL Championship final. The league would serve as a secondary league in the Canadian soccer landscape as the American-based North American Soccer League expanded into British Columbia and Ontario.

Overview 
The membership in the league decreased to ten teams with Hamilton Primos, and Toronto Roma disbanding their teams. Stanley Park Stadium the league's primary stadium for its Toronto members received the necessary funds from the city to renovate the facility.

Teams

References

External links
RSSSF CNSL page
thecnsl.com - 1968 season

1968–69 domestic association football leagues
National Soccer League
1968